De Lange is a Dutch surname, meaning "the tall one". Older origins of the surname may be attributed to the French invasion of the Netherlands, meaning "the Angel". In 2007 about 11,000 people in the Netherlands carried the name. Notable people with this surname include:

 (1855–1927), Dutch publisher and book dealer
Andre de Lange (born 1984), South African cricketer
 (1916–1978), Dutch actor
Con de Lange (born 1981), South African cricketer
Cornelia Catharina de Lange (1871–1950), Dutch pediatrician who described De Lange syndrome 
Daan de Lange (1915–1988), Dutch and Norwegian chess player
 (1841–1918), Dutch cellist, composer and conductor 
Eddie De Lange (1904–1949), American bandleader and lyricist
Espen de Lange, Norwegian curler (active 1980s–1990s)
Esther de Lange (born 1975), Dutch politician
Esther de Lange (cricketer) (born 1984), Dutch cricketer
 (1937–2016), German footballer
Ilse de Lange (born 1977), Dutch country and pop singer
Jelle de Lange (born 1998), Dutch footballer
Jens Isak de Lange Kobro (1882–1967), Norwegian politician
Jeroen de Lange (born 1968), Dutch politician
Jochum de Lange, 18th-century Norwegian farmer's rebellion leader 
Johann de Lange (born 1959), Afrikaans poet, short story writer and critic
Karin de Lange (born 1964), Dutch sprinter
Leendert de Lange (born 1972), Dutch politician
Marchant de Lange (born 1990), South African cricketer
Marie Jeanette de Lange (1865–1923), Dutch painter and dress reform advocate
Nicholas de Lange (born 1944), British rabbi and historian
Patrick de Lange (born 1976), Dutch baseball player
Paul de Lange (born 1981), Dutch footballer
Peter James de Lange (born 1966), New Zealand botanist
Philip de Lange (c.1705–1766), Dutch-Danish architect
Pieter de Lange (1926–2019), South African educationalist
Rik de Lange (born 1956), Dutch politician
Samuel de Lange Jr. (1840–1911), Dutch organist and composer
 (1811–1894), Dutch pianist, organist and composer
Titia de Lange (born 1955), Dutch biochemist at Rockefeller University
Theodore Jasper Maclean de Lange (1914–2005), RNZAF Air Commodore
Trygve de Lange (1918–1981), Norwegian lawyer 
Ute de Lange Nilsen (born 1931), Czech-Norwegian jewelry artist and puppet maker
Veronique de Lange (born 1987), South African singer
Victoria Puig de Lange (1916–2008), Ecuadorian author, magazine editor, and diplomat

See also
DeLange
Lange (surname)
De Korte – Dutch surname meaning "the short one"

References

Dutch-language surnames
Afrikaans-language surnames
Surnames of Dutch origin